The Barkantine Estate is a large social housing estate in Millwall built by the London County Council in the lates 1960's, located on the Isle of Dogs and is also composed of a pub, shopping promenade and park.

History
The decision to proceed with the development was made in March 1965, with first block being opened in 1968.

The estate originally consisted of 634 dwellings.

Funds were spent by the London Docklands Development Corporation to refurbish some of the buildings, adding facades and improving the appearance of walkways in 1984.

The 1996 Docklands bombing caused serious damage to parts of the Barkantine Estate. This led to the demolishing of Lantern House, and building 40 low-rise flats in their place.

The Quarterdeck
The Quarterdeck is a pedestrianized uncovered promenade and park within the Barkantine Estate and serves as the district centre of Millwall, it includes a number of shops and services as well as a pub called the Tooke Arms. It is known in council planning as the Quarterdeck Shopping Centre.

References

Housing estates in the London Borough of Tower Hamlets
Millwall